Alfred Jens Bjørlo (born 17 December 1972) is a Norwegian politician.

He was elected representative to the Storting from the constituency of Sogn og Fjordane for the period 2021–2025, for the Liberal Party.

Bjørlo was mayor in the former municipality of Eid from 2011.

References

1972 births
Living people
Liberal Party (Norway) politicians
Sogn og Fjordane politicians
Mayors of places in Norway
Members of the Storting